Kevin Lynch (born April 23, 1991) is an American professional ice hockey player who is currently an unrestricted free agent who most recently contracted with the Grand Rapids Griffins of the American Hockey League (AHL). Lynch was selected by the Columbus Blue Jackets in the 2nd round (56th overall) of the 2009 NHL Entry Draft.

Playing career
Lynch attended the University of Michigan where he played four seasons (2009 – 2013) of NCAA hockey with the Michigan Wolverines. He was a member of the 2008–09 CCHA champion Wolverines.

On September 10, 2013, the Grand Rapids Griffins of the American Hockey League signed Lynch to a one-year contract. After attending the Griffins training camp, he was reassigned to ECHL affiliate, the Toledo Walleye to begin the 2013-14 season.  Lynch spent the duration of the season in the ECHL, and after 53 games with the Walleye was reassigned to the Evansville IceMen.

On September 11, 2014, Lynch decided to continue in the ECHL, signing a one-year deal with the Florida Everblades. On December 15, 2014, Lynch was signed to an AHL contract for the remainder of the season with the Everblades affiliate, the Syracuse Crunch.

On July 7, 2016, Lynch's rights were traded by the Everblades to the Indy Fuel. He then agreed to a one-year deal with the Fuel.

On January 21, 2017, the Crunch signed Lynch to a PTO. He spent the remainder of the season with the Crunch and the entirety of their Calder Cup playoff run to the finals. Following the finish of the season, the Crunch signed Lynch to a one-year AHL contract for the 2017–18 season.

Following the season, Lynch was signed to a one-year, two-way contract by NHL affiliate, the Tampa Bay Lightning. He missed the entirety of the 2018–19 season due to many injuries sustained throughout the season and three surgeries. He had suffered a concussion and leg injury in preseason action with the Lightning, a groin injury in October 2018, and they were all followed by three surgeries dealing with his injuries.

Lynch earned an offer to 2019 Lightning Training camp despite being a pending free agent. He was later released without a contract and signed to a one-year AHL contract with the Laval Rocket on October 1, 2019. He would spend the 2019–20 season with Laval before being released after appearing in 7 regular season games to start the 2020–21 season.

As a free agent into the off-season, Lynch continued his professional career in agreeing to a one-year AHL contract with the Grand Rapids Griffins on August 9, 2021.

International play
As a junior, Lynch played the USA Hockey National Team Development Program from 2007 – 2009. He won a gold medal with Team USA at the 2009 IIHF World U18 Championships, and was recognized for his outstanding performance during the tournament when he was named a Top 3 Player for his team.

Career statistics

Regular season and playoffs

International

Awards and honors

References

External links

1991 births
Living people
American men's ice hockey centers
Columbus Blue Jackets draft picks
Evansville IceMen players
Florida Everblades players
Indy Fuel players
Ice hockey players from Michigan
Laval Rocket players
Manitoba Moose players
Michigan Wolverines men's ice hockey players
People from Grosse Pointe, Michigan
Syracuse Crunch players
Toledo Walleye players
USA Hockey National Team Development Program players